CIKX-FM is a Canadian radio station broadcasting in Grand Falls, New Brunswick at 93.5 MHz and 5,300 watts. CIKX was originally a repeater of CJCJ in Woodstock until the 2000s, when the station opened its studios.

In April 2000, CIKX began airing programming separate from CJCJ. Studios and offices are located at 399 Broadway Boulevard in Grand Falls. On June 7, 2000, Telemedia Radio Atlantic Ltd. received CRTC approval to add a transmitter for CIKX-FM at Plaster Rock using the facilities of the CJCJ rebroadcasting transmitter, CJCJ-2. As a result of the change, the CJCJ rebroadcasters CJCJ-1 and CJCJ-2 were deleted.

On April 12, 2007, Astral Media Radio Atlantic Inc. received approval to operate a transmitter for CIKX at Plaster Rock (CIKX-FM-1) operating on 91.7 MHz with an effective radiated power of 50 watts. The new transmitter would replace the existing AM transmitter at that location. The AM transmitter was inefficient, worn-out and difficult to maintain. The AM transmitter site was in a low-lying area. The new FM transmitter would be located in an area with an elevation for line-of-sight coverage.

On February 4, 2008, Astral Media Radio Atlantic Inc. received approval to change the frequency of CIKX-FM-1 to 88.3 MHz.

As part of a mass format reorganization by Bell Media, on May 18, 2021, CIKX flipped to adult hits, and adopted the Bounce branding.

Rebroadcasters
CIKX-FM-1 88.3 FM - Plaster Rock

Former logo

References

External links
Bounce 93
 

Ikx
Grand Falls, New Brunswick
Ikx
Ikx
Radio stations established in 1998
1998 establishments in New Brunswick